Ronald James Marinaccio (born July 1, 1995) is an American professional baseball pitcher for the New York Yankees of Major League Baseball (MLB). He made his MLB debut in 2022.

Career
Marinaccio is from Toms River, New Jersey. He attended Toms River High School North, and played baseball for the school's team. He
played college baseball at the University of Delaware. He was drafted by the New York Yankees in the 19th round of the 2017 Major League Baseball Draft.

The Yankees added Marinaccio to their 40-man roster after the 2021 season. He was named to the Yankees Opening Day roster for the 2022 season. He made his major league debut on April 9.

References

External links

1995 births
Living people
Baseball players from New Jersey
Charleston RiverDogs players
Delaware Fightin' Blue Hens baseball players
Gulf Coast Yankees players
Major League Baseball pitchers
New York Yankees players
Pulaski Yankees players
Scranton/Wilkes-Barre RailRiders players
Somerset Patriots players
Sportspeople from Toms River, New Jersey
Staten Island Yankees players
Toms River High School North alumni